Blake Gibson (born 19 April 1995) is a New Zealand rugby union player who currently plays as a loose forward for  in the ITM Cup and the  in Super Rugby.

Early career

Born in Auckland, Gibson attended Saint Kentigern College in the city and captained their first XV to victory in their local 1A championship.   This led to his selection in the Blues Development XV later in the year.

Senior career

Gibson joined the Auckland ITM Cup team in his first year out of school and made a total of 9 appearances in his first full season scoring 2 tries.   Named again to play in the Auckland side for the 2015 ITM Cup, he started the opening game of the season at openside flanker, but suffered a knee injury in the first ten minutes that kept him out for the duration of the campaign.   The 2016 New Zealand domestic season didn't bring much more luck as he mustered 2 tries in 2 matches before again missing the remainder of the year through injury as his Auckland side missed out on the Premiership Play-offs and finished up in 5th position on the log standings.

Super Rugby

Gibson's first season at provincial level made a big enough impression that he was offered a contract as a member of the  wider training squad for the 2015 Super Rugby season. The 2016 Super Rugby season saw him earn plenty of game time under new head coach, Tana Umaga. He made 9 appearances, 6 of which were from the start and scored his debut Super Rugby try, making easy work of All Blacks fullback Ben Smith by throwing him and 3 other defenders off. Despite his injury struggles during the later half of the year, Gibson was again named in the Blues squad for 2017. Gibson is now in the hurricanes playing number 7.

International

Gibson was named to start for an experienced NZ Barbarians side that played against the Maori All Blacks, shortly after the conclusion of the 2015 Super Rugby Season.   Playing at openside flanker, he scored the first try of the game in a standout performance.

He was also a vital member of the New Zealand under-20 side which won the 2015 World Rugby Under 20 Championship.   He scored 2 tries in 4 championship games and was named player's player of the day on 3 occasions during the tournament.

Gibson was called up to the All Blacks in 2017 as injury cover following Sam Cane's concussion. Gibson has yet to be capped for New Zealand.

Career honours

New Zealand Under-20

World Rugby Under 20 Championship - 2015

Super Rugby statistics

References

1995 births
Living people
New Zealand rugby union players
Rugby union flankers
Rugby union number eights
Auckland rugby union players
Blues (Super Rugby) players
Rugby union players from Auckland
People educated at Saint Kentigern College
Hurricanes (rugby union) players
Tokyo Sungoliath players